Victory is a surviving 1919 American action film directed by Maurice Tourneur and starring Jack Holt, Seena Owen, Lon Chaney, Wallace Beery and Bull Montana. The film is an adaptation of the 1915 eponymous novel by Joseph Conrad (the only film adaptation of one of his works that he ever lived to see). The screenplay was written by Jules Furthman and Ben Carré was the art director.

The film was chosen by the New York Times as one of the top ten films of 1919. It was later remade in 1930 as Dangerous Paradise, and again in 1940 as Victory. The film still exists in its complete form in the Library of Congress and is available on DVD. A lobby card exists showing Lon Chaney in the role of Ricardo.

Plot
Axel Heyst (Holt), a solitary individual, lives by himself on an otherwise deserted island in the South Seas. When he travels to a neighboring island on business, he encounters a pretty young girl named Alma, who is being abused by her boss, Mr. Schomberg, at the hotel where she works.
Axel takes pity on the poor girl and helps her to escape with him to his island getaway in a boat, making it plain however that he seeks only a platonic relationship with all other human beings.

When Mr. Schomberg discovers Alma has left him, he sends three horrific criminal types (Mr. Jones, Ricardo and Pedro) after her, tricking them into thinking there is a hidden treasure on Axel's island. The grimacing Ricardo (Lon Chaney) is the evilest of the three, constantly cleaning his fingernails with a long stiletto-type knife. The brutish Pedro (Bull Montana) follows Mr. Jones' orders slavishly, but is unaware that years earlier, Mr. Jones sadistically killed his brother by burning him alive.

The three scoundrels arrive on Axel's island and while he initially extends his hospitality to them, he realizes they are plotting to kill him, rob his house and take Alma away with them. A fight erupts and Axel kills Ricardo by shooting him off the roof of his house. Mr. Jones is killed by Pedro in the same fashion in which he had killed Pedro's brother. Axel and Alma realize their love for each other and decide to get married and live happily on the island.

Cast

 Jack Holt as Axel Heyst
 Seena Owen as Alma
 Lon Chaney as Ricardo
 Wallace Beery as August Schomberg
 Ben Deeley as Mr. Jones
 Laura Winston as Mrs. Schomberg
 Bull Montana as Pedro
 George Nichols as Captain Davidson

Reception

"The characterization of Lon Chaney as Ricardo and that of Bull Montana as Pedro were especially well handled." ---Wid's Film Daily

"The vividly vicious work of Lon Chaney as Ricardo deserves more than passing mention... In fact, Mr. Chaney may be said to "run away with the play" at certain stages, completely overshadowing his contemporaries." ---Exhibitors Trade Review

"An original and interesting picture, picturesque in detail, splendid types, a refreshing change from the conventional in nearly all respects." ---Moving Picture World

"Maurice Tourneur has created a moving and effective picture drama for Paramount.....Probably the eagle eye of the censor is responsible for cutting the fight between Alma and Ricardo, but it is well cut. Of the latter character, Lon Chaney gave a visualization that was very effective." ---Variety

"The most compelling characters in VICTORY are three roving birds of prey---Mr. Jones, the leader, Ricardo, his secretary, and Pedro, his strong man. The most diabolically conspicuous of the three is Ricardo, played by Lon Chaney...No screen actor whose name comes to mind can equal Mr. Chaney in the impersonation of intense, strongly marked types. He does with consummate skill and fine finish the kind of acting that many attempt with lumbering ponderosity and maladroit exaggeration." ---The New York Times

References

External links

 

Dialogue and commentary about the movie at silentsaregolden.com
Stills and commentary at Dreamland Cafe

1919 films
American black-and-white films
1910s English-language films
Films based on British novels
Films based on works by Joseph Conrad
Films directed by Maurice Tourneur
American romantic drama films
American silent feature films
1919 romantic drama films
Films set in Indonesia
Films with screenplays by Jules Furthman
Paramount Pictures films
1910s American films
Silent romantic drama films
Silent American drama films